Somveer Sangwan is an Indian politician. He was elected to the Haryana Legislative Assembly from Dadri in the 2019 Haryana Legislative Assembly election as a member and Independent candidate. Previously, he was associated with Bharatiya Janata Party.

References 

1972 births
Living people
Bharatiya Janata Party politicians from Haryana
Charkhi Dadri district
Haryana MLAs 2019–2024